John Wagner may refer to:

John Wagner (born 1949), American-born British comics writer
John A. Wagner (1885–1964), Michigan politician
John C. Wagner (1858–1937), American politician and businessman
John D. Wagner, American author and businessman
John P. Wagner (1874–1955), American baseball shortstop
John W. Wagner, (1837–1896), Union Army soldier in the American Civil War who received the Medal of Honor

See also
Jack Wagner (disambiguation)